Miresa is a genus of moths in the family Limacodidae described by Francis Walker in 1855.

Description
Palpi not reaching beyond frontal tuft. Antennae of male with serrated distal half, mid and hind tibia with terminal pairs of spurs. Forewings with veins 7, 8 and 9 stalked. Hindwings with veins 6 and 7 on a short stalk or from cell.

Species
Miresa albipuncta Herrich-Schäffer, 1854 (India, Sri Lanka)
Miresa argentifera Walker (Sri Lanka)
Miresa basirufa Hering, 1941 (Congo)
Miresa bilineata Hering, 1928
Miresa bracteata Butler, 1880 (India, Indonesia, Malaysia, Thailand)
Miresa burmensis Hering (China, Laos, Myanmar, Thailand, Vietnam)
Miresa clarissa (Stoll, 1790) (Costa Rica, French Guiana)
Miresa demangei de Joannis (Bhutan, China, Myanmar, Vietnam)
Miresa exigua (China, Myanmar)
Miresa fangae Wu & Solovyev, 2011 (China)
Miresa fulgida Wileman (China, Taiwan, Vietnam)
Miresa gilba Karsch, 1899 (Ghana)
Miresa gliricidiae Hering, 1933 (Sierra Leone)
Miresa habenichti Wichgraf, 1913 (Mozambique)
Miresa kwangtungensis Hering, 1931 (China, Laos, Vietnam)
Miresa livida West, 1940 (Congo)
Miresa polargenta Wu & Solovyev, 2011 (Vietnam)
Miresa rorida (Laos, Thailand)
Miresa sagitovae (Myanmar, Thailand, Vietnam)
Miresa semicalida Hampson, 1910 (Congo, Zambia)
Miresa sibinoides Hering, 1931
Miresa strigivena Hampson, 190 (Nigeria)
Miresa urga Hering, 1933 (China)

References

 - with images

External links

Limacodidae genera
Limacodidae
Taxa named by Francis Walker (entomologist)